David Walter Allan (born 5 November 1937) is a former West Indian cricketer who played in five Tests from 1962 to 1966.  He was wicket-keeper in all five Tests.

Born in Hastings, Christ Church, Barbados, Allan played first-class cricket for Barbados from 1955–56 to 1965–66, and toured England with the West Indies teams in 1963 and 1966. He played two Tests against India in 1961–62, one against Australia in 1964–65, and two against England in 1966.

References

External links
 

1937 births
Living people
West Indies Test cricketers
Barbadian cricketers
Barbados cricketers
International Cavaliers cricketers
People from Christ Church, Barbados
People educated at The Lodge School, Barbados
Wicket-keepers